Acidic leucine-rich nuclear phosphoprotein 32 family member A is a protein that in humans is encoded by the ANP32A gene. It is one of the targets of an oncomiR, MIRN21.

Interactions
Acidic leucine-rich nuclear phosphoprotein 32 family member A has been shown to interact with MAP1B, TAF1A and Protein SET.

See also
 ANP32B, ANP32C, ANP32D, ANP32E

References

Further reading

External links